Catacometes is a genus of moths of the family Oecophoridae.

Species
Catacometes hemiscia (Meyrick, 1883)
Catacometes phanozona (Turner, 1896)

References

Markku Savela's ftp.funet.fi

 
Oecophorinae
Moth genera